This is the list of awards and nominations received by the television series 24 (2001–2010).

By Awards

Primetime Emmy Award

Golden Globe Awards

Screen Actors Guild Awards

Satellite Awards

Directors Guild of America Awards

Producers Guild of America Awards

Writers Guild of America Awards

Television Critics Association Awards

References

Awards
24